Fernie Leone Blade (née Shevill) (20 August 1910 – 28 September 1988) was an Australian cricketer. Blade was born in Sydney, New South Wales. She played one Test match for the Australia national women's cricket team in 1934. Blade was the eleventh woman to play test cricket for Australia. She died in Forster, New South Wales.

References

1910 births
1988 deaths
Australia women Test cricketers
Cricketers from Sydney